CD-186 or No. 186 was a Type D escort ship of the Imperial Japanese Navy during World War II.

History
She was laid down on 11 April 1944 at the Nagasaki shipyard of Mitsubishi Heavy Industries for the benefit of the Imperial Japanese Navy and launched on 30 December 1944. On 15 February 1945, she was completed and commissioned. On 2 April 1945, while escorting a convoy composed of No.28-class submarine chaser CH-49, No.1-class landing ship T-17, and No.103-class landing ships T-145 and T-146, she was attacked and sunk by planes from Rear Admiral Arthur W. Radford's Task Group 58.4 near Amami Ōshima at coordinates . T-17 and T-145 were also sunk while CH-49 and T-146 were damaged.

On 25 May 1945, she was struck from the Navy List.

References

1944 ships
Type D escort ships
Ships built by Mitsubishi Heavy Industries
Ships sunk by US aircraft